Fabian Diepstraten, better known as Febiven, is a Dutch former professional League of Legends player. During his career which spanned seven years, he played for several teams, including Misfits Gaming, Clutch Gaming, Fnatic, H2k-Gaming, and Cloud9 Eclipse.

Career 
Febiven first joined Cloud9 Eclipse in the EU CS in January 2014, and this was the start of his eSports career. The team failed to qualify for the EU LCS, however during that time Febiven had attracted the attention of several large organisations. In May 2014, Febiven left Cloud 9 Eclipse to join team H2k-Gaming.

On 7 January 2015, H2k-Gaming announced Febiven's departure. He then joined the reinvented team of Fnatic and his performance increased drastically. With a 7.8 KDA and first place in the EU LCS Championships, he has become one of the best-known mid laners in Europe.

In December 2016, Febiven returned to H2K, where he finished 6th in the Spring Split, and 4th in the Summer Split, missing a trip to worlds.

On 23 June 2016 he and teammate Rekkles broke the creep score (CS) world record with 858 minions killed in a game.

On 2 December 2017 Clutch Gaming announced that he would be the starting mid laner for the team for the Season 8 NA LCS Spring Split.

After a year in NA LCS, Febiven has returned to his home soil in Europe where he joined Misfits Gaming.

Personal life 
Febiven appeared on the cover of Vogue Netherlands in March 2016.

Tournaments results

Fnatic 
 1st — 2015 EU LCS Spring
 3rd–4th — 2015 Mid-Season Invitational	
 1st — 2015 EU LCS Summer
 3rd–4th — 2015 World Championship	
 3rd–4th — IEM X Cologne
 3rd — 2016 EU LCS Spring playoffs
 2nd — IEM X World Championship

References 

Cloud9 (esports) players
Clutch Gaming players
H2k-Gaming players
Fnatic players
Misfits Gaming players
League of Legends mid lane players
Dutch esports players
Living people
Twitch (service) streamers
Year of birth missing (living people)